

See also
Media in Canada

Yukon
Television